is a former Japanese football player. He played for Japan national team.

Club career
Chano was born in Ichikawa on 23 November 1976. After graduating from high school, he joined his local club JEF United Ichihara (later JEF United Chiba) in 1995. He played many matches as center back from 1998. The club won second place in the 1998 Emperor's Cup. The club also won third place in the 2001 and 2003 J1 League. He moved to Júbilo Iwata with teammate Shinji Murai in 2005. He played many matches as center back with Japan national team player Makoto Tanaka. He left the club with Murai at the end of the 2009 season for a generational change and he returned to JEF United Chiba with Murai in 2010. He retired at the end of the 2011 season.

National team career
On 25 April 2004, Chano debuted for Japan national team against Hungary. In July, he was elected Japan for 2004 Asian Cup. At this tournament, although he did not play in the match, Japan won the champions. He also played at 2005 Confederations Cup. He played 7 games for Japan until 2005.

Club statistics

National team statistics

National team career statistics

Appearances in major competitions

Squads
 2004 Asian Cup

Honors and awards

Team honors
 AFC Asian Cup Champions: 2004

References

External links

 
Japan National Football Team Database

1976 births
Living people
Association football people from Chiba Prefecture
Japanese footballers
Japan international footballers
J1 League players
J2 League players
JEF United Chiba players
Júbilo Iwata players
2004 AFC Asian Cup players
2005 FIFA Confederations Cup players
AFC Asian Cup-winning players
Association football defenders